Ma Perkins (sometimes called Oxydol's Own Ma Perkins) is an American radio soap opera that was heard on NBC from 1933 to 1949 and on CBS from 1942 to 1960. It was also broadcast in Canada, and Radio Luxembourg carried it in Europe. 

The program began on WLW in Cincinnati, Ohio, where it was broadcast from August 14, 1933 to December 1, 1933. Its network debut occurred on NBC on December 4, 1933. Between 1942 and 1949, the show was heard simultaneously on both networks. During part of its run on NBC, that network's coverage was augmented by use of transcriptions. Beginning April 1, 1935, nine stations broadcast the transcriptions. Oxydol dropped its sponsorship in 1956.
The program continued with various sponsors until 1960.

The series was produced by Frank and Anne Hummert with scripts by Robert Hardy Andrews, Orin Tovrov, and others. Ma Perkins began August 14, 1933, on WLW in Cincinnati. On December 4 of that year, it graduated to the NBC Red network. On NBC and CBS the series ran for a total of 7,065 episodes.

"America’s mother of the air" was portrayed by actress Virginia Payne, who began the role at the age of 19 and never missed a performance during the program's 27-year run. Kindly, trusting widow Ma Perkins had a big heart and a great love of humanity. She always offered her homespun philosophy to troubled souls in need of advice.

Ma Perkins is widely credited with giving birth to storytelling and content-based advertising.

Characters and story
Ma owned and operated a lumber yard in the town of Rushville Center (population 4000), where the plotlines pivoted around her interactions with the local townsfolk and the ongoing dilemmas of her three children, Evey, Fay and John. One of her children died during World War II. Ma's daughter Fay was played by Marjorie Hannan, Isabelle Krehbiel and Rita Ascot. Gilbert Faust had the role of John. Evey Perkins was played by Lillian White, Dora Johnson, Laurette Fillbrandt and Kay Campbell, who later became known for playing Grandma Kate Martin on the television soap opera All My Children. Shuffle Shober, Ma's best friend, was played by Charles Egelston (and later Edwin Wolfe). Murray Forbes was heard as Willie Fitz, and Cecil Roy portrayed Junior Fitz.

In "Sounds from the Past," Chris Plunkett offered an overview of the series:
Typical of Hummert productions, Ma Perkins had her share of tears, crises, and drama, but with a plotline much slower paced than the average soap opera. In a typical year, no more than three or four major complications were covered --interspersed by long "quiet spells," filled with (brutally) protracted discussions on the meaning of life amid the ever-changing tapestry of family, friends and the small town around them... Early in the drama’s run Ma was portrayed as quite combative and spiteful, but her character soon developed (and softened) into the kindhearted sage and conscience of the entire community. There were various dramas that unfolded over the years, some more far-fetched than others. Two of the more memorable plot stretches involve Ma exposing a black market baby-napping ring, and Ma harboring Soviet political dissidents inside her home.

When the show ended on Friday, November 25, 1960, the day after Thanksgiving Day, it was one of only eight entertainment shows still on the CBS radio network. The last episode was the only one in which Virginia Payne's name was mentioned, by Payne herself in a farewell speech.  In all other episodes, the announcer at the close of the show would run down the names of all the actors in the cast (but one), and then say, "... and Ma Perkins."

Cast
Virginia Payne - Ma Perkins
Charles Egelston - Shuffle Shober, Ma's best friend (1933-1958)
Edwin Wolfe - Shuffle Shober (1958-1960)
Dora Johnson - Evey Perkins (1933-1944)
Laurette Fillbrandt - Evey Perkins (1944-1945)
Kay Campbell - Evey Perkins (1945-1960)
Isabelle Krehbiel - Fay Perkins (1933)
Rita Ascot - Fay Perkins
Margaret Draper - Fay Perkins
Gilbert Faust - John Perkins

See also
List of radio soap operas
List of longest-serving soap opera actors

References

Further reading
Andrews, Robert Hardy. A Corner of Chicago. Boston: Little, Brown, 1963.
Cox, Jim. The Great Radio Soap Operas. Jefferson, North Carolina: McFarland, 1999.
LaGuardia, Robert. From Ma Perkins to Mary Hartman: The Illustrated History of Soap Operas. New York: Ballantine Books, 1977.
Ohmart, Ben. It's That Time Again. Albany: BearManor Media, 2002. 
Stumpf, Charles. Ma Perkins, Little Orphan Annie and Heigh Ho Silver. Carlton, 1971.
Westin, Jeane Eddy. Making Do: How Women Survived the '30s. Follett, 1976.

Listen to
Ma Perkins radio shows from 1950 (52 episodes)
Dick Bertel interview with Virginia Payne on Hartford's WTIC (January, 1973)

External links

1933 radio programme debuts
1960 radio programme endings
1940s American radio programs
1950s American radio programs
1960s American radio programs
American radio soap operas
NBC radio programs
CBS Radio programs